A BMX bike is an off-road sport bicycle used for racing or stunt riding. BMX means bicycle motocross.

Construction 
Though originally denoting a bicycle intended for BMX racing, the term "BMX bike" is now used as a generic term to encompass race bikes ('class' and 'cruiser') and those used for freestyle disciplines (street, vert, park, flatland), and dedicated dirt jumper bicycles. Frames are made of various types of steel, aluminum, or carbon fiber. Cheaper, low-end bikes are usually made of steel. Higher range freestyle bikes are mostly chromoly, such as lightweight 4130 chromoly, or generation 3 chromoly. BMX race bikes extensively use aluminum or carbon fiber.

Models 
BMX bicycles are available in these models types:
 Dirt – These bikes feature tires with thicker and wider tread for better grip on potentially loose surfaces. 
 Flatland – flatland style BMX bikes have different frame geometry to traditional park BMX bikes because flatland riding requires precise balance on multiple parts of the bike.
 Park – park style BMX bikes (also called vert) are often made lighter by reducing the structural strength of particular areas of the bike, which is possible because park riding does not occur on particularly rough terrain. Brakes may or may not be installed.
 Race – racing style BMX bikes feature lighter materials and slightly different frame geometry and sizes. Racing BMX bikes are required to have brakes. Their light weight construction and wide array of customizable gear ratios allow race bikes to accelerate quickly. Conversely, the lightweight construction means race bikes are not for freestyle (tricks) use.
 Street – modern street style BMX bikes commonly have nylon composite sleeved pegs attached to the axles to enable the rider to grind or balance on various raised obstacles. Metal pegs have fallen out of favor among street riders due to the unkempt nature of street obstacles. Also, the street BMX is heavier and stronger due to the extra strain encountered with the hard, flat surfaces of street riding. Street riders commonly have no cable brakes to enable the rider to spin the bars without the brake cable getting in the way. Riders use their foot against the top of the back tire to slow down, or fit a u-brake to the rear with an extended cable or a gyro to allow for full rotation of the bars.

Notable BMX bike manufacturers 

Current and former makers of BMX bikes include:
 Advanced Sports International
 Diamondback Bicycles
 Dynacraft BSC
 Ellsworth Handcrafted Bicycles
 Fuji Bikes
 GT Bicycles
 Haro Bikes
 Huffy
 JMC Bicycles
 Mongoose
 Next
 Nishiki
 Pacific Cycle
 Redline bicycles
 Ross
 SE Racing
 Schwinn Bicycle Company
 Torker

See also
 Dirt jumping
 Pump track
 Cycling
 Glossary of cycling
 Outline of cycling
 Fixed-gear bicycle
 D.I.D chain
 Izumi chain

References 

BMX
Cycle types